Stephen Ellis may refer to:
 Stephen Ellis (politician) (born 1968), Canadian politician
 Stephen Ellis (film editor), British documentary film editor and producer
 Stephen Ellis (historian) (1953–2015), British historian, Africanist and human rights activist

See also
 Steven Ellis (disambiguation)